Dohnal (feminine Dohnalová) is a Czech surname. Notable people with the surname include:
 Darcie Dohnal (born 1972), American speed skater
 Jaroslav Dohnal, translator of Kafka, possible pseudonym of Milena Jesenská (1896-1944) 
 Johanna Dohnal (1939-2010), Austrian politician
 Zdeněk Dohnal (born 1945), Czech cyclist

Czech-language surnames